Mohammad Mujeeb (1902-1985) was an Indian writer of English and Urdu literature, educationist, scholar and the vice chancellor of Jamia Millia Islamia, Delhi.

Early life and education
Mujeeb was born in 1902 to Mohammad Naseem, a wealthy barrister from Lucknow.

Mujeeb studied history at Oxford University. He was a close friend and associate of Zakir Hussain, the third president of India, and Abid Husain. Later, he did advanced training in printing in Germany before returning to India to join Jamia Millia Islamia in 1926 as a faculty member, along with Zakir Hussain and Abid Hussain.

Career

He was a scholar of History and was involved in the cultural and educational milieu of post-independent India.

Literary works

English
 A Glimpse of New China 
 Ordeal 1857: A Historical Play 
World history, our heritage 
Education and Traditional values 
 Social reform among Indian Muslims 
 Akbar 
 Ghalib 
 Dr Zakir Hussain: a biography 
 Islamic Influence on Indian Society 
 The Indian Muslims 
 Education, Literature and Islam 
 Three Plays

Urdu
Dunya Ki Kahani 
Azma’ish 
Gazaliyat-e-Ghalib 
Tarikh Falsafa-e-Siyasiyat 
Nigarishat 
Rusi Adab

Awards
Padma Bhushan (1965) for his contributions to literature and education.

Death and legacy
Mujeeb died in 1985, at the age of 83. Jamia Millia Islamia has instituted an annual oration, Professor Mohammad Mujeeb Memorial Lecture, in Mujeeb's honour.

See also
 Jamia Millia Islamia

References

External links

 

1902 births
1985 deaths
20th-century Indian writers
20th-century Indian educational theorists
Alumni of the University of Oxford
English-language writers from India
Historians of South Asia
Indian Marxist historians
20th-century Indian historians
20th-century Indian Muslims
Scholars from Lucknow
Urdu-language writers from India
Recipients of the Padma Bhushan in literature & education
Heads of universities and colleges in India
Writers from Delhi
Academic staff of Jamia Millia Islamia